The Minister for Home Affairs in the Government of Australia is the minister responsible for the Department of Home Affairs, the country's interior ministry. The current minister is Clare O'Neil of the Labor Party, who has held the position since 1 June 2022 in the Albanese ministry.

The current Department of Home Affairs was created in December 2017. The first department with that name was created in 1901, as one of the original six departments created at Federation, and was responsible for a wide range of areas not captured by the other departments. Similar departments have existed in almost all subsequent governments, under several different names. The specific title "Minister for Home Affairs" has been created six times – in 1901, 1929, 1977, 1987, 2007 and 2017.

History

The Minister for Home Affairs was a ministerial portfolio that existed continuously from 1901 to 12 April 1932, when Archdale Parkhill became Minister for the Interior in the first Lyons Ministry—subsuming his portfolios of Home Affairs and Transport.

The Home Affairs or Interior portfolio was responsible for various internal matters not handled by other ministries. In due course, other portfolios were established that took over functions from it, including:
Transport from 1928 to 1932 and continuously since 1941
Immigration since 1945
Agriculture since 1942
Industry from 1928 to 1945 and since 1963

The Minister for the Interior existed from 1932 to 1972. The Territories of Australia portfolio has been the responsibility for the varying titles of the Minister for Territories.

The Home Affairs Ministry was re-established in 2007, assuming the responsibilities of the Minister for Justice and Customs within the Attorney-General's Department with policy responsibilities for criminal justice, law enforcement, border control and national security and with oversight responsibilities of the Australian Customs Service and the Border Protection Command, the Australian Federal Police, the Australian Crime Commission, and the Office of Film and Literature Classification.

From September 2010 to September 2013, the Minister for Home Affairs also held the position of Minister for Justice. In September 2013 with the change of government, the position Minister for Home Affairs was disbanded and its responsibilities were assumed by the newly created Minister for Immigration and Border Protection for border control and by the Minister for Justice for law enforcement.

On 18 July 2017, Prime Minister Malcolm Turnbull announced the creation of a new home affairs department to be headed by Immigration Minister Peter Dutton, with responsibility for immigration, border control, domestic security, and law enforcement.

On 20 December 2017, Governor-General Peter Cosgrove swore Dutton into the position of Minister for Home Affairs. The Home Affairs portfolio was formed by way of an Administrative Arrangements Order issued on 20 December 2017 with responsibilities for national security including cybersecurity and counterterrorism, law enforcement, emergency management, transport security, immigration, citizenship, border control, and multicultural affairs.

List of Ministers for Home Affairs

The following individuals have been appointed as Minister for Home Affairs, or any of its related titles:

 Morrison was appointed as Minister for Home Affairs by the Governor-General on Morrison's advice in May 2021, with both Morrison and Andrews holding the position of Minister for Home Affairs until May 2022. However, the appointment of Morrison was not made public until August 2022.

List of Assistant Minister for Customs, Community Safety and Multicultural Affairs
The following individuals have been appointed as Assistant Minister for Customs, Community Safety and Multicultural Affairs, or any of its related titles:

Former ministerial titles

List of ministers for Citizenship and Multicultural Affairs

The following individuals have been appointed as Minister for Citizenship and Multicultural Affairs, or any of its related titles:

List of ministers for Law Enforcement and Cybersecurity

The following individuals have been appointed as Minister for Law Enforcement and Cybersecurity, or any of its related titles:

List of Assistant Ministers for Home Affairs

The following individuals have been appointed as Assistant Minister for Home Affairs, or any of its related titles:

See also

 Department of Home Affairs (1901–16)
 Department of Home and Territories (1916–1928)
 Department of Home Affairs (1928–32)
 Department of the Interior (1932–39)
 Department of the Interior (1939–72)
 Department of Home Affairs (1977–80)
 Department of Home Affairs and Environment (1980–84)
 Department of Home Affairs (2017–Present)

References

External links
 

Home Affairs